Andrew John Thompson (born October 8, 1975) is a former Major League Baseball left fielder who played for the Toronto Blue Jays in .

Thompson was drafted straight out of Sun Prairie High School by the Toronto Blue Jays in the 23rd round of the 1994 Major League Baseball Draft. His best minor league season came in  when he hit 31 home runs and had 95 RBI for Double-A Knoxville and Triple-A Syracuse. He started  with Triple-A Syracuse, but was briefly promoted to the majors in May where he had 1 hit in the only 2 games of his major league career.

References

External links
, or Retrosheet, or Pelota Binaria (Venezuelan Winter League)

1975 births
Living people
American expatriate baseball players in Canada
Baseball players from Wisconsin
Cardenales de Lara players
American expatriate baseball players in Venezuela
Dunedin Blue Jays players
Durham Bulls players
Hagerstown Suns players
Knoxville Smokies players
Major League Baseball left fielders
New Haven Ravens players
People from Oconomowoc, Wisconsin
Sportspeople from the Milwaukee metropolitan area
Syracuse SkyChiefs players
Toronto Blue Jays players